Carbon monophosphide is a diatomic chemical with formula CP.  It is a heavier analog of the cyanide radical (CN). CP and CN are both open-shell species with doublet Π ground electronic states while the ground states of CS and CO are closed-shell. The related anion, CP−, is called cyaphide and isoelectronic with CS.

Detection in interstellar medium
The simple diatomic carbon monophosphide (CP) was detected in the circumstellar envelope of the star IRC +10216 in 1990. The identification was made by matching 10 rotational lines observed with the IRAM 30m radiotelescope.

References

Inorganic carbon compounds
Phosphides